The Atlantic Bridge is a flight route from Gander, Newfoundland, Canada to Scotland, with a refueling stop in Iceland.  

During the Second World War, new bombers flew this route. Today, it is seldom used for commercial aviation, since modern jet airliners can fly a direct route from Canada or the United States to Europe without the need for a fueling stop.  However, smaller aircraft which do not have the necessary range to make a direct crossing of the ocean still routinely use this route, or may alternatively stop in Greenland, typically via Narsarsuaq and Kulusuk or the Azores for refueling.  The most common users of this route are ferry pilots delivering light aeroplanes (often six seats or less) to new owners.

This route is longer overall than the direct route and involves an extra landing and takeoff, which is costly in fuel terms.

See also
Transatlantic flight

References
 Atlantic Bridge: the Official Account of RAF Transport Command's Ocean Ferry, HM Stationery Office, 1945

Trans-oceanic aviation
Aircraft ferrying
Aviation in the Atlantic Ocean